Ramnath Dhondu Parkar  (31 October 1946 – 11 August 1999) was an Indian cricketer who played in two Test matches in 1972–73 against Tony Lewis' England team touring India. He represented Bombay in the Ranji Trophy and played in 85 first class matches in his career. He was the opening partner of Sunil Gavaskar for Bombay for many years.

Parkar became unconscious when his two-wheeler was knocked down by another vehicle in Mumbai in December 1995. Multiple surgeries and therapies were tried to revive him. He remained in coma for 43 months and died in August 1999.

References

1946 births
1999 deaths
Cricketers from Mumbai
India Test cricketers
Indian cricketers
West Zone cricketers
Mumbai cricketers
State Bank of India cricketers
Vazir Sultan Tobacco cricketers
Road incident deaths in India